Si Wichian  is a capital tambon (subdistrict) of Nam Yuen district, in Ubon Ratchathani Province, Thailand. In 2021, it had a population of 13,888 people. Neighbouring subdistricts are (clockwise from the west) Song, Bu Pueai, and Dom Pradit, as well as Choam Khsant District of Cambodia in the south.

History
Si Wichian gained tambon (subdistrict) status in 1981 by absorbing seven other villages located in the Song's eastern area. Since the Nam Yuen district government office is in such a separate area, Si Wichian has become the de facto district capital, replacing Song, which served as the seat of the district since Nam Yuen was a small district (king amphoe) affiliated with Det Udom in 1969, and was later promoted to an independent district in 1974. Previously, during the reign of King Mongkut (1851–1868), the present-day Si Wichian subdistrict was covered by Champasak's Ban Chanla Na Dom (บ้านจันลานาโดม); currently is Dom Pradit, a former district relegated to tambon in 1912. 

After its establishment, Tambon Si Wichian was administered by two different local governments, including the Sukhaphiban Nam Yuen (สุขาภิบาลน้ำยืน), founded in 1973, which governed a populous area in the district's town center and covers some parts of Song and Si Wichian, and the Subdistrict Council of Si Wichian, which covers the tambon's remaining area. The subdistrict council was later upgraded to the Subdistrict Administrative Organization (SAO) in 1997, and, effective on December 13, 2013, it was later promoted to a subdistrict municipality. Meanwhile, the Sukhaphiban Nam Yuen was promoted to a subdistrict municipality in 2005.

Geography
The tambon covers 109.1 km2 and is located in the central region of the Nam Yuen district. The north, which accounts for one-third of the total area and is home to the majority of the population, is an undulating plateau; another one-third in the middle is a rolling plain used for agriculture; and the remaining one-third in the south is the highland of the Dângrêk Mountains, which forms the border between Thailand and Cambodia.

Administration
The subdistrict of Si Wichian is divided into sixteen villages (mubans; หมู่บ้าน). As of the 2021 census, it had a population of 13,888 people with 4,958 households.

The area is shared by two local governments; the district's town center is governed by the Nam Yuen Subdistrict Municipality (เทศบาลน้ำยืน, Nam Yuen Township), which also governs some of the neighboring subdistrict, Song, while the remaining area is covered by the Si Wichian Subdistrict Municipality (เทศบาลตำบลสีวิเชียร, Si Wichian Township).

The following is a list of the subdistrict's mubans, which roughly correspond to the villages.

References

Tambon of Ubon Ratchathani Province